God Is Love is an album by Dave Fitzgerald. Released in 2004, it is the latest release from flute and saxophone player from this founding member of Iona.

Track listing
 "Opening"
 "Ubi Caritas"
 "God So Loved"
 "Love"
 "Agnus Dei"
 "Ma Navu"
 "Tallis"
 "O Euchari"
 "No Scenes Of Stately Majesty"
 "Hydrydol"
 "There Is A Green Hill"
 "Amazing Love"
 "I Will Sing Of Your Love Forever"

Personnel
Dave Fitzgerald - Soprano & Tenor Saxophones, Flutes, Assorted Woodwind

Release Details
2004, UK, ICC Records ICCD79630, Release Date ? ? 2004, CD

Reviews

Peter Ould of Cross Rhythms praised the usage of woodwind instruments in God is Love.

References

2004 albums
Dave Fitzgerald albums